Union of Left-Democratic Parties was an alliance of political parties in Afghanistan. The Union was formed in November 1987, in a process of opening a multi-party system in the country. The founders of the Union were the governing People's Democratic Party of Afghanistan, Revolutionary Toilers Organisation of Afghanistan and the Toilers Organisation of Afghanistan. The Peasants Justice Party of Afghanistan participated as an observer.

The Young Workers Organisation of Afghanistan and the Alliance of Peace and Progress Fighters of Afghanistan joined the alliance sometime around 1988–1989.

References

Defunct left-wing political party alliances
Defunct political party alliances in Afghanistan
People's Democratic Party of Afghanistan
Socialist parties in Afghanistan